Macaroni Hamin (Hamin Macaroni in Hebrew) is a traditional Sephardic Jerusalemite dish originally from the Jewish Quarter of the Old City of Jerusalem. It consists of macaroni, chicken, potatoes and spices. Traditionally Macaroni Hamin is slow cooked overnight before Shabbat. Similar to other dishes prepared in communities of Jewish Sephardic and Iraqi origin haminados eggs can be added. Macaroni Hamin is still eaten by Sephardic Jews who have origins inside the Old City of Jerusalem.

Preparation
The dish is made with pre-cooked bucatini pasta. Chicken  pieces are browned with the skin on, and set aside. Onions are browned in the same pot with the chicken fat, and tomato paste is added, with spices to flavor like cinnamon, nutmeg and cardamom, if desired. The sauce is simmered gently and poured over the pre-cooked pasta. Potato slices are added, in a layer, to the pot, over which a portion of the bucatini is layered, then the browned chicken and whole uncooked eggs, still in the shell. The remaining bucatini is layered on top and a small amount of boiling water is poured into the pot. The dish is cooked slowly for at least 6 hours, usually baked overnight, and traditionally served for Shabbat.

The dish is flipped upside down when served similar to Maqluba.

See also 
 Hamin
 Israeli cuisine

References

Israeli cuisine
Sephardi Jewish cuisine
Macaroni dishes
Culture of Jerusalem
Shabbat food
Pasta dishes
Chicken dishes